Basil Biggs (1819–1906) was a free African American laborer and veterinarian. He lived near Gettysburg and was reportedly involved with the Underground Railroad.

Formative years
Biggs was born in Carroll County, Maryland in 1819. His mother died when he was four. During the 1840s, Biggs married Mary Jackson. They had seven children. They moved from Maryland to Gettysburg in 1858.

Later years
Following the Battle of Gettysburg, Biggs was hired to disinter bodies from temporary cemeteries, place them in coffins, and rebury them. The work started in October 1863 and ended in March 1864. He was paid $1.25 per body and worked with a crew of laborers. Gettysburg's Unknown Soldier, Amos Humiston, was among the disinterred.

Biggs used his earnings to purchase a farm in Gettysburg. He started the organization The Sons of Good Will in order to acquire land for black cemeteries.

Death and interment
Biggs died on June 6, 1906, and was interred at the Lincoln Cemetery in Gettysburg.

Legacy
Playwright and actor Anna Deavere Smith is Biggs' great-great-granddaughter.

References

External links
1917 photograph of the Basil Biggs farmhouse

1819 births
1906 deaths
African-American farmers
19th-century American farmers
American veterinarians
Male veterinarians
Farmers from Pennsylvania
People from Carroll County, Maryland
Underground Railroad people
People from Gettysburg, Pennsylvania
20th-century African-American people
20th-century American farmers